Lukáš Handlovský (born 3 August 1986) is a Slovak professional ice hockey player who currently plays with MHk 32 Liptovský Mikuláš of the Slovak Extraliga.

Career
He previously played for with HC '05 Banská Bystrica, HC Sparta Praha, SK Horácká Slavia Třebíč, BK Mladá Boleslav, MsHK Žilina, HKM Zvolen and HK Poprad.

Career statistics

Regular season and playoffs

International

References

External links

1986 births
Living people
BK Mladá Boleslav players
HC '05 Banská Bystrica players
HC Slovan Ústečtí Lvi players
HC Sparta Praha players
HKM Zvolen players
MsHK Žilina players
HK Poprad players
MHk 32 Liptovský Mikuláš players
SK Horácká Slavia Třebíč players
Slovak ice hockey forwards
Sportspeople from Banská Bystrica
Slovak expatriate ice hockey players in the Czech Republic